Princess Adorndibyanibha or Phra Chao Boromwongse Ther Phra Ong Chao Adorndibyanibha (RTGS: Athon Thiphayanipha) (21 April 1889 – 23 March 1958), was a Princess of Siam. She was a member of Siamese Royal Family, and the daughter of Chulalongkorn, King Rama V of Siam.

Her mother was Chao Chom Manda Chum Krairoek, daughter of Lord (Phra) Mangkalaratana Rajamontri. She had a younger sister, Princess Suchitra Bharani. She died on  23 March 1958, at the age of 68.

Royal Decorations
   Dame of The Most Illustrious Order of the Royal House of Chakri: received 9 May 1950
  Dame Cross of the Most Illustrious Order of Chula Chom Klao (First class): received 2 May 1950

Ancestry

1889 births
1958 deaths
19th-century Chakri dynasty
20th-century Chakri dynasty
19th-century Thai women
20th-century Thai women
19th-century Thai people
20th-century Thai people
Thai female Phra Ong Chao
Order of Chula Chom Klao
Children of Chulalongkorn
Daughters of kings